Maxwell Scherrer Cabelino Andrade (born 27 August 1981), known as Maxwell, is a Brazilian former professional footballer who played as a left-back. He is currently employed by Paris Saint-Germain as assistant sporting director.

Maxwell came through the ranks at Cruzeiro and played for Ajax, Internazionale, Barcelona and Paris Saint-Germain, winning trophies for each of these clubs. He was the most decorated active footballer in Europe at the time of his retirement, with 30 official titles. He made his international debut with Brazil in 2013 and appeared at the 2014 FIFA World Cup.

Club career

Early career
Born in Cachoeiro de Itapemirim, Espírito Santo, Maxwell started his career at Cruzeiro. In June 2001, he signed a five-year contract with AFC Ajax. Maxwell played his best season for Ajax in the 2003–04 season, only missing three games for the Eredivisie champions that season due to international duty, and becoming the Dutch Footballer of the Year. He was seriously injured in April 2005 and never played again for Ajax.

Internazionale
Maxwell's contract with Ajax was restructured to expire early, on 2 January 2006, in order to facilitate his move to Internazionale on a free transfer. Due to non-EU player registration quota per year, however, he was signed by Empoli until the end of season before being officially transferred to Inter, a deal similar to that of Júlio César's move to Chievo. Maxwell, however, did not make any appearances for Empoli.

In July 2006, Inter officially announced the signing of Maxwell on a four-year contract as a domestic transfer. Maxwell impressed during his first season in Serie A, most notably against Parma at San Siro when he scored a fine solo effort after a defender struck him which was voted Inter's thunder goal of the season by Inter channel viewers.

Initially playing at left-back, the 2007–08 season saw him move further up the field, with Cristian Chivu replacing him at left-back while Maxwell played a left midfield role. This became very effective as Maxwell adapted well to the winger role which made use of his blistering pace. In that season, he won his second consecutive Scudetto with Inter. In the 2008–09 season, he suffered a serious injury that took him out of competition for six weeks. He returned to action and was a constant fixture in the starting XI and showed his impressive old form before the injury. He scored his second goal for Inter on 14 December against Chievo, which Inter won 4–2, after an assist from Dejan Stanković.

Barcelona

On 15 July 2009, it was announced that Barcelona and Inter had reached an agreement, with Maxwell joining the Catalan club for €4.5 million plus €500,000. Two days later, Maxwell signed a five-year contract and was presented as a new Barça player. He made his debut for the club in the second leg of the 2009 Supercopa de España, playing all 90 minutes. He had an important role in the second part of the season when Eric Abidal was injured and helped Barcelona win La Liga.

Maxwell started Barcelona's first competitive match of the 2010–11 season, the first leg of the 2010 Supercopa de España, in an advanced left-wing position; he assisted the opening goal for Zlatan Ibrahimović.

Paris Saint-Germain

On 12 January 2012, Maxwell penned a three-year deal at Paris Saint-Germain after passing his medical examination. PSG paid €3.5 million for the player.  For the 2013–14 season, he was the starting left-back, replacing Siaka Tiéné, who left the club for Montpellier. On 28 February 2014, Maxwell extended his contract until June 2015.

On 4 February 2015, Maxwell scored the only goal as PSG defeated Lille away to reach the Coupe de la Ligue Final.

Passport controversy
It was alleged that Maxwell registered as an EU player during 2006 to 2009 with Inter, but he was signed by Barcelona as a non-EU player (Brazil), as Maxwell did not present a passport from a European country. UEFA started to investigate the case in August 2010, but in fact Inter signed him as a domestic transfer and he arrived in Italy as a non-EU player for Empoli, and had not violated Italian Football Federation (FIGC) regulations. FIGC only restricted Italian football clubs from signing non-EU players from abroad, except 1 quota (2 as of the 2011–2012 season) is given to Serie A clubs per season if the club released or sold abroad the non-EU player, or the player himself got an EU nationality.

On 25 August 2010, Inter declared that Maxwell was always a non-EU player with the club.

International career

Maxwell was capped for the 2004 CONMEBOL Pre-Olympic Tournament with the Brazil under-23 squad in January 2004. 

In October 2004, he received his first call-up to the senior team for the 2006 World Cup qualifying matches, but did not make any appearances.

Maxwell earned his first full senior international cap on 14 August 2013, coming on as a substitute in a 1–0 friendly defeat to Switzerland in Basel.

On 7 May 2014, Maxwell was included in Luiz Felipe Scolari's 23-man Brazil squad for the 2014 World Cup, which was held on home soil. He made his only appearance in the tournament in the third-place play-off, held in Brasília, starting at left-back as Brazil were defeated 3–0 by the Netherlands; he played the full 90 minutes in his final international match.

Following the tournament, Maxwell was no longer called up by manager Dunga, and announced his retirement from international football in October 2014.

Post-playing career 
After his retirement from playing, Maxwell was appointed assistant sporting director at Paris Saint-Germain, working with sporting director Antero Henrique.

Style of play 
A world-class, diminutive attacking left-back, Maxwell made a name for himself as an excellent, dependable, intelligent, experienced, successful, and largely underrated defender throughout his career, who was known above all for his consistency and longevity at the top level. While being a good ball-winner, and naturally solid defensively, he was also extremely classy and elegant on the ball, confident in possession, and reliable in his distribution, rarely relinquishing the ball; his wide range of skills thus enabled him to bring balance to his teams in the full-back or wing-back position. A versatile player, he was also extremely effective going forward due to his skill and pace; indeed, during the course of a match, he often pushed further up the pitch with his offensive runs down the left flank, in order to get into good positions from which he could deliver crosses to teammates in the area, or help to stretch the play, and was also capable of playing in a more advanced role as a left-winger, either in midfield, or in a three-man attack. Off the pitch, Maxwell was an introverted yet highly respected and likeable figure with his teammates, who was often cited as a key dressing room personality, in spite of his calm, gentle nature and reserved character; he has been described by his close friend and former teammate Ibrahimović as "incredibly sensitive", and a "nice guy".

Personal life

Maxwell is known to be one of Zlatan Ibrahimović's closest friends; they were teammates at Ajax, Internazionale, Barcelona and PSG. There are several anecdotes about him in Ibrahimović's autobiography, I Am Zlatan Ibrahimović. Ibrahimović states that Maxwell will be remembered for his calm nature and gentle style of play.

Career statistics

Club
Source:

International
Appearances and goals by national team and year

Honours
Ajax
Eredivisie: 2001–02, 2003–04
KNVB Cup: 2001–02
Johan Cruyff Shield: 2002

Internazionale
Serie A: 2006–07, 2007–08, 2008–09
Supercoppa Italiana: 2008

Barcelona
La Liga: 2009–10, 2010–11
Supercopa de España: 2009, 2010
UEFA Champions League: 2010–11
UEFA Super Cup: 2009
FIFA Club World Cup: 2009, 2011

Paris Saint-Germain
Ligue 1: 2012–13, 2013–14, 2014–15, 2015–16
Coupe de France: 2014–15, 2015–16, 2016–17
Coupe de la Ligue: 2013–14, 2014–15, 2015–16, 2016–17
Trophée des Champions: 2013, 2015, 2016

Individual
Ajax Talent of the Year (Marco van Basten Award): 2001–02
 Ajax Player of the Year (Rinus Michels Award): 2003–04
 Dutch Footballer of the Year: 2003–04
 Dutch Golden Shoe: 2003–04
 Ligue 1 Team of the Year: 2012–13,  2014–15, 2015–16

References

External links

 FC Barcelona profile
 

1981 births
Living people
Sportspeople from Espírito Santo
Brazilian Baptists
Brazilian footballers
Association football fullbacks
Cruzeiro Esporte Clube players
Eredivisie players
AFC Ajax players
Serie A players
Inter Milan players
Empoli F.C. players
La Liga players
FC Barcelona players
Ligue 1 players
Paris Saint-Germain F.C. players
Brazilian expatriate footballers
Expatriate footballers in the Netherlands
Expatriate footballers in Italy
Expatriate footballers in Spain
Expatriate footballers in France
Brazilian expatriate sportspeople in the Netherlands
Brazilian expatriate sportspeople in Italy
Brazilian expatriate sportspeople in Spain
Brazilian expatriate sportspeople in France
Brazil international footballers
2014 FIFA World Cup players
UEFA Champions League winning players
Paris Saint-Germain F.C. non-playing staff